Habariheshay is a village in the Aynabo District, in the Sool region of Somaliland.

Demographics 
It is primarily inhabited by the Solomadow sub-division of the Habr Je'lo Isaaq.

See also

References 

Populated places in Sool, Somaliland